Faggot, often shortened to fag, is a usually pejorative term used to refer to gay men. In American youth culture around the turn of the 21st century, its meaning extended as a broader reaching insult more related to masculinity and group power structure.

The usage of fag and faggot has spread from the United States to varying extents elsewhere in the English-speaking world (especially the UK) through mass culture, including film, music, and the internet.

Etymology
The American slang term is first recorded in 1914, the shortened form fag shortly after, in 1921. Its immediate origin is unclear, but it is based on the word for "bundle of sticks", ultimately derived, via Old French, Italian and Vulgar Latin, from Latin fascis.

The word faggot has been used in English since the late 16th century as an abusive term for women, particularly old women, and reference to homosexuality may derive from this, as female terms are often used with reference to homosexual or effeminate men (cf. nancy, sissy, queen). The application of the term to old women is possibly a shortening of the term "faggot-gatherer," applied in the 19th century to people, especially older widows, who made a meager living by gathering and selling firewood. It may also derive from the sense of "something awkward to be carried" (compare the use of the word baggage as a pejorative term for old people in general).

An alternative possibility is that the word is connected with the practice of fagging in British public schools, in which younger boys performed (potentially sexual) duties for older boys, although the word faggot was never used in this context, only fag. There is a reference to the word faggot being used in 17th-century Britain to refer to a "man hired into military service simply to fill out the ranks at muster," but there is no known connection with the word's modern usage.

The Yiddish word faygele, lit. "little bird," itself a pejorative term for a gay man, has been claimed by some to be related to the American usage. The similarity between the two words makes it possible that it might at least have had a reinforcing effect.

There is an urban legend, called an "oft-reprinted assertion" by Douglas Harper, that the modern slang meaning developed from the standard meaning of faggot as "bundle of sticks for burning" with regard to burning at the stake. This is unsubstantiated; the emergence of the slang term in 20th-century American English is unrelated to historical death penalties for homosexuality.

Use

Early printed use
The word faggot with regard to homosexuality was used as early as 1914, in Jackson and Hellyer's A Vocabulary of Criminal Slang, with Some Examples of Common Usages which listed the following example under the word, drag:

"All the fagots (sissies) will be dressed in drag at the ball tonight."

The word fag is used in 1923 in The Hobo: The Sociology of the Homeless Man by Nels Anderson:

“Fairies or Fags are men or boys who exploit sex for profit.”

The word was also used by a character in Claude McKay’s 1928 novel Home to Harlem, indicating that it was used during the Harlem Renaissance. Specifically, one character says that he cannot understand:

"a bulldyking woman and a faggoty man"

Use in the United Kingdom
Originally confined to the United States, the use of the words fag and faggot as epithets for gay men has spread elsewhere in the English-speaking world, but the extent to which they are used in this sense has varied outside the context of imported US popular culture. In the UK and some other countries, the words queer, homo, and poof are much more common as pejorative terms for gay men. The word faggot in the UK also refers to a kind of meatball. In British English, 'fag' is common slang for a cigarette, sometimes also used to describe a tedious task.

Use of fag and faggot as the term for an effeminate man has become understood as an Americanism in British English, primarily due to entertainment media use in films and television series imported from the United States. When Labour MP Bob Marshall-Andrews was overheard supposedly using the word in a bad-tempered informal exchange with a straight colleague in the House of Commons lobby in November 2005, it was considered to be homophobic abuse.

Usage by youth
Through ethnographic research in a high school setting, CJ Pascoe examined how American high school boys used the term fag during the early 2000s. Pascoe's work, culminating in a 2007 book titled Dude, You're a Fag: Masculinity and Sexuality in High School, suggested that these boys used the fag epithet as a way to assert their own masculinity, by claiming that another boy is less masculine; this, in their eyes, makes him a fag, and its usage suggests that it is less about sexual orientation and more about gender. One-third of the boys in Pascoe's study claimed that they would not call a homosexual peer a fag, leading Pascoe to argue that fag is used in this setting as a form of gender policing, in which boys ridicule others who fail at masculinity, heterosexual prowess, or strength. Because boys do not want to be labeled a fag, they hurl the insult at another person. Pascoe felt the fag identity does not constitute a static identity attached to the boy receiving the insult. Rather, fag is a fluid identity that boys strive to avoid, often by naming another as the fag. As Pascoe asserts, "[the fag identity] is fluid enough that boys police their behaviors out of fear of having the fag identity permanently adhere and definitive enough so that boys recognize a fag behavior and strive to avoid it."

Use in popular culture

There is a long history of using both fag and faggot in popular culture, usually in reference to gay and bisexual men. Rob Epstein and Jeffrey Friedman's 1995 documentary The Celluloid Closet, based on Vito Russo's book of the same name notes the use of fag and faggot throughout Hollywood film history. The Think Before You Speak campaign has sought to stop fag and gay being used as generic insults.

Theater
In 1973 a Broadway musical called The Faggot was praised by critics but condemned by gay liberation proponents.

Books and magazines
Larry Kramer's 1978 novel Faggots discusses the gay community including the use of the word within and towards the community. A description of Pamela Moore's 1956 novel Chocolates for Breakfast in the Warner Books 1982 culture guide The Catalog of Cool reads: "Her fifteen-year-old heroine first balls a fag actor in H'wood, then makes it with some hermetic, filthy rich, hotel-bound Italian count."

In its November 2002 issue, the New Oxford Review, a Catholic magazine, caused controversy by its use and defense of the word in an editorial. During the correspondence between the editors and a gay reader, the editors clarified that they would only use the word to describe a "practicing homosexual." They defended the use of the word, saying that it was important to preserve the social stigma of gays and lesbians.

Music

Arlo Guthrie uses the epithet in his 1967 signature song "Alice's Restaurant," noting it as a potential way to avoid military induction at the time (Guthrie had removed the word from live performances of the song in the 21st century).

Phil Ochs uses the epithet in his 1969 song "I Kill Therefore I Am". In the song, which is written from the point of view of a hateful police officer, he uses the slur to describe the student activists who protested the Vietnam War.

The Dire Straits 1985 song "Money for Nothing" makes notable use of the epithet faggot, although the lines containing it are often excised for radio play, and in live performances by singer/songwriter Mark Knopfler. The song was banned from airplay by the Canadian Broadcast Standards Council in 2011 but the ban was reversed later the same year.

In 1989, Sebastian Bach, lead singer of the band Skid Row, created a controversy when he wore a T-shirt with the parody slogan "AIDS: Kills Fags Dead".

The 2001 song "American Triangle" by Elton John and Bernie Taupin uses the phrase God hates fags where we come from. The song is about Matthew Shepard, a Wyoming man who was murdered in 1998 for being gay.

The 2007 song "The Bible Says," which includes the line "God Hates Fags" (sometimes used as an alternate title) caused considerable controversy when it was published on various websites. Apparently an anti-gay song written and performed by an ex-gay pastor "Donnie Davies," it was accompanied by the realistic Love God's Way website about his "ministry." Debate ensued about whether Donnie Davies and the outrageous song, which included a few double entendres, were for real, and whether the lyrics could ever be considered acceptable even in satire. Donnie Davies was revealed in 2007 to be a character played by an actor. Some gay rights advocates acknowledge that as a spoof it is humorous, but claim the message behind it is still as malicious as someone who seriously possessed the opinion.

In December 2007, BBC Radio 1 caused controversy by editing the word faggot from their broadcasts of the Kirsty MacColl and The Pogues song "Fairytale of New York," deeming it potentially homophobic; however, the edit did not extend to other BBC stations, such as BBC Radio 2. Following widespread criticism and pressure from listeners, the decision was reversed and the original unedited version of the song was reinstated, with clarification from Andy Parfitt, the station controller, that in the context of the song the lyrics had no "negative intent."

Patty Griffin uses the word faggot in her song "Tony", about a classmate of hers from high school who committed suicide.

McCafferty uses the word faggot in the song "Trees", about lead singer Nick Hartkop's struggles coming to terms with his sexuality.

Eminem used the word in numerous works, such as "Rap God", along with an inflammatory lyric containing the term being removed from "Fall".

In 2012, Macklemore used the word faggot in the song "Same Love" in reference to the use of the homophobic slur in cyberbullying.

Television
In November 2009, the South Park episode "The F Word" dealt with the overuse of the word fag. The boys use the word to insult a group of bikers, saying that their loud motorcycles ruined everyone else's nice time. Officials from the dictionary, including Emmanuel Lewis attend in the town and agree that the meaning of the word should no longer insult homosexuals but instead be used to describe loud motorcycle riders who ruin others' nice times. The episode is a satire on the taboo of using the term, as it goes against political correctness.

Reclamation
Some LGBTQ+ people have reclaimed the term as a neutral or positive term of self-description.

See also

 Breeder
 Fag hag
 Fag stag
 Gayphobia
 Hate mail
 Hate speech

References

Further reading
 Ford, Michael Thomas. That's Mr. Faggot to You: Further Trials from My Queer Life, Alyson Books, 1999.

External links

 How did "faggot" get to mean "male homosexual"? on The Straight Dope.

1910s neologisms
English profanity
Male homosexuality
LGBT-related slurs
Homophobic slurs
Slang terms for men
English words